This Is What the Edge of Your Seat Was Made For is the first EP by British rock band Bring Me the Horizon. It was released on 25 September 2004, through Thirty Days of Night Records in Australia and on 30 January 2005, through Visible Noise Records in the UK. The Visible Noise re-issue features a slightly altered artwork.

Background
This Is What the Edge of Your Seat Was Made For was released on 25 September 2004 in the US through Earache Records. The original pressing, on Thirty Days of Night Records, was a strict run of only 1,000 copies. Its title comes from the first line of lyrics found in the track "Traitors Never Play Hangman". According to an interview with the band, "Traitors Never Play Hangman" was originally two different songs. One being "Traitors Never Play Hangman", and the other called "We Are All Movie Stars". They played them live one after another to begin with but after a while they decided to join the two songs together into one.

The EP initially had its work being done with this song being two separate songs wherein the EP would be a five-track release that would include the songs: "Who Wants Flowers When You're Dead? Nobody.", "Dagger", "Passe Compose", "Traitors Never Play Hangman" and "We Are All Movie Stars". The artwork was different as well, with the cover featuring the band's logo with a sparrow in the corner of the cover standing about a bottle of leaking love hearts.

Reception

Critical reception

Jack Rogers writing for Rock Sound reviewed the song "RE: They Have No Reflections" and commented that it is "Scrappy, heavy and completely and utterly debauched".

Accolades
The EP won "The Most Brootal E.P of the Year" 2004 in a poll published in the alternative music magazine ABM.
The track "Who Wants Flowers When You're Dead? Nobody." was included in NMEs special edition magazine titled "501 Lost Songs", where it was listed in the metal section of the countdown with eleven other songs by bands such as Metallica, Slipknot and Marilyn Manson.

Track listing

Personnel
 Oliver Sykes – lead vocals
 Lee Malia – lead guitar
 Curtis Ward – rhythm guitar
 Matt Kean – bass guitar
 Matt Nicholls – drums

References

External links

This Is What the Edge of Your Seat Was Made For at YouTube (streamed copy where licensed)

2004 debut EPs
Bring Me the Horizon albums